Ju was a Dongyi state in modern Shandong province during the Zhou dynasty (1046–256 BCE) of ancient China. The rulers of Ju had the surname of Ji 己. According to the Shuowen Jiezi, "Ju" means taro or a wooden tool. It was weakened by wars with the states of Chu and Qi. Eventually the state was annexed by Qi, and the City of Ju became a major stronghold of Qi.

Notes

Ancient Chinese states